Ariel Germán Giles (born March 20, 1978 in Baradero (Buenos Aires), Argentina) is a former Argentine footballer who played for clubs of Argentina and Chile.

Teams
  Villa Dálmine 1996-2000
  Deportes Puerto Montt 2001
  Sportivo Baradero 2002-2010

References
 

1978 births
Living people
Argentine footballers
Argentine expatriate footballers
Puerto Montt footballers
Chilean Primera División players
Expatriate footballers in Chile
Association footballers not categorized by position
People from Baradero
Sportspeople from Buenos Aires Province